Nikita Shabalkin (born October 9, 1986) is a Russian former professional basketball player. At a height of 2.06 m (6'9") tall, and a weight of 105 kg (232 lbs.), he played at both the small forward and power forward positions.

Professional career
Shabalkin last played for UNICS Kazan, of the Russian PBL.

Russian national team
Shabalkin was a member of the senior men's Russian national basketball team. With Russia's senior national team, he played at the EuroBasket 2007, where he won a gold medal, and at the EuroBasket 2011, where he won a bronze medal.

References

External links
 Euroleague.net Profile
 Triumph Profile

1986 births
Living people
BC Dynamo Moscow players
BC Khimki players
BC Samara players
BC UNICS players
PBC CSKA Moscow players
PBC Lokomotiv-Kuban players
BC Zenit Saint Petersburg players
Sportspeople from Vladikavkaz
Power forwards (basketball)
Russian men's basketball players
Small forwards
Universiade medalists in basketball
Universiade silver medalists for Russia
Medalists at the 2009 Summer Universiade